Talithia D. Williams is an American statistician and mathematician at Harvey Mudd College who researches the spatiotemporal structure of data. She was the first black woman to achieve tenure at Harvey Mudd College. Williams is an advocate for engaging more African Americans in engineering and science.

Education
Her educational background includes a bachelor's degree in Mathematics from Spelman College, Master's degrees in both Mathematics from Howard University and Statistics from Rice University, and a Ph.D. in Statistics from Rice University.  Dr. Williams was in one of the first EDGE cohorts.

Career and research
Williams has worked at the Jet Propulsion Laboratory (JPL),  the National Security Agency (NSA), and NASA. She is an associate professor of mathematics and also serves as Associate Dean for Research and Experiential Learning at Harvey Mudd College. She is Secretary and Treasurer for the EDGE Foundation which sponsors summer programs for women, and on the boards of the MAA and SACNAS. Williams has done significant outreach, with the goal of bringing mathematics to life and "rebranding the field of mathematics as anything but dry, technical or male-dominated but instead a logical, productive career path that is crucial to the future of the country."

Williams has developed statistical models focused on understanding the structure of spatiotemporal data, with environmental applications. She has partnered with the World Health Organization in developing a cataract model used to predict the cataract surgical rate for countries in Africa.

Williams was a host of the six part PBS series NOVA Wonders in April 2018. She is the author of the book Power in Numbers: The Rebel Women of Mathematics (Race Point Publishing, 2018).  Williams was the narrator for the five-part PBS series NOVA Universe Revealed in November 2021.

TED talk 
In 2014, Williams gave a highly viewed TED talk titled "Own Your Body's Data", discussing the potential insights to be gained from collecting personal health data.

Honors
In 2015 Williams received the MAA Henry L. Alder Award for exemplary teaching by an early career mathematics professor.  Williams was honored by the Association for Women in Mathematics and the Mathematical Association of America, when they selected her to be the  AWM/MAA Falconer Lecturer at MathFest 2017 in Chicago, IL. The title of her talk is "Not So Hidden Figures: Unveiling Mathematical Talent." Williams was also recognized by Mathematically Gifted & Black as a Black History Month 2017 Honoree. She received the 2022 Joint Policy Board for Mathematics Communication Award "for bringing mathematics and statistics into the homes of millions through her work as a TV host, renowned speaker, and author."

References 

20th-century American mathematicians
21st-century American mathematicians
American women mathematicians
African-American mathematicians
Spelman College alumni
Rice University alumni
Harvey Mudd College faculty
Living people
Year of birth missing (living people)
20th-century women mathematicians
21st-century women mathematicians
21st-century American women
Data activism